The 2002 California Insurance Commissioner election occurred on November 5, 2002. The primary elections took place on March 5, 2002. Former Deputy Secretary of the Interior John Garamendi, the Democratic nominee, defeated Corporations Commissioner Gary Mendoza, the Republican nominee, for the office previously held by Harry W. Low.

Primary Results
A bar graph of statewide results in this contest are available at https://web.archive.org/web/20080905210236/http://primary2002.ss.ca.gov/Returns/ins/00.htm.

Results by county are available here and here.

Democratic

Republican

Other Parties

Results

Results by county
Results from the Secretary of State of California:

See also
California state elections, 2002
State of California
California Insurance Commissioner

References

External links
VoteCircle.com Non-partisan resources & vote sharing network for Californians
Information on the elections from California's Secretary of State

2002 California elections
California Insurance Commissioner elections
California